Konstanz is an electoral constituency (German: Wahlkreis) represented in the Bundestag. It elects one member via first-past-the-post voting. Under the current constituency numbering system, it is designated as constituency 287. It is located in southern Baden-Württemberg, comprising the district of Konstanz.

Konstanz was created for the inaugural 1949 federal election. Since 2005, it has been represented by Andreas Jung of the Christian Democratic Union (CDU).

Geography
Konstanz is located in southern Baden-Württemberg. As of the 2021 federal election, it is coterminous with the district of Konstanz.

History
Konstanz was created in 1949. In the 1949 election, it was Baden constituency 1 in the numbering system. In the 1953 through 1961 elections, it was number 183. In the 1965 through 1976 elections, it was number 186. In the 1980 through 1998 elections, it was number 191. In the 2002 and 2005 elections, it was number 288. Since the 2009 election, it has been number 287.

Originally, the constituency comprised the independent city of Konstanz and the districts of Landkreis Konstanz and Überlingen. In the 1965 through 1976 elections, it comprised the districts of Konstanz and the Überlingen district excluding the municipalities of Adelsreute and Wangen.

Members
The constituency has been held continuously by Christian Democratic Union (CDU) since its creation. It was first represented by Josef Schüttler from 1949 to 1961, followed by Hermann Biechele from 1961 to 1980. Hans-Peter Repnik was representative from 1980 to 2005, a total of seven consecutive terms. Andreas Jung has been representative since 2005.

Election results

2021 election

2017 election

2013 election

2009 election

Notes

References

Federal electoral districts in Baden-Württemberg
1949 establishments in West Germany
Constituencies established in 1949
Konstanz (district)